Olympic Committee of Costa Rica (IOC code: CRC) is the National Olympic Committee representing Costa Rica.

The committee was created in 1953 although Costa Rica first competed at the Olympics in 1936.

References

External links 

Costa Rica
Olympic
Costa Rica at the Olympics
1953 establishments in Costa Rica
Sports organizations established in 1953